Álvaro Domínguez may refer to:

Álvaro Domínguez (footballer, born 1981), Colombian footballer
Álvaro Domínguez (footballer, born 1989), Spanish footballer